Alexander Nelson Hansell (6 October 1857 – 1940) was a British architect known primarily for his activities in Kobe, Japan. In 1891 he became a fellow of the Royal Institute of British Architects He had an apprentice named Yokoyama Eikichi.

Life 

Hansell was born on 6 October 1857 in Caen in Normandy, France.His father Peter Hansell was a British pastor, who had been rector of Kingsdon, Somerset before being appointed as Consular Chaplain of Caen on 11 October 1853. Father and son later returned together to Somerset, England.

At some point Alexander moved from Somerset to Winchester, where he studied architecture, and in 1888 he moved to Japan. He worked teaching English at a seminary on Lot 18 of the Kawaguchi foreign settlement in Osaka before beginning his activities as an architect. His first job was the planning of the Harris Science Hall at Doshisha University. He continued on to design the clubhouse of the newly renamed Kobe Club at the Kobe foreign settlement, and was thereafter involved in the planning of many more structures both inside the foreign settlement and in the surrounding mixed residential zone.

During the First World War, Alexander's only son Kenneth was killed in battle. Alexander mourned his loss greatly, and in 1920 he moved to Hankou in China, and then later to Monaco, where he died.

Hansell's personal residence, known as the Choueke House, is now run as a tourist attraction, located on Yamamoto-dōri in Chūō-ku, Kobe.

Important works 
In and around the foreign concession
  office at Lot 122 in the concession: 1893
 : 1896, Hansell's own residence
 Club Concordia clubhouse at Lot 126 in the concession: 1896
 German consulate at Lot 115 in the concession: 1901
 HSBC at Lot 2 in the concession: 1902
 Jardine Matheson at Lot 67 in the concession: 1905
 : 1912, currently owned by the stained glass artist Michiyo Durt-Morimoto
 Standard Chartered bank at Lot 67 in the concession
  (assumed): 1903, Important Cultural Property
  (assumed): 1902, Important Cultural Property

Elsewhere
 Harris Science Hall at Doshisha University: 1890, Important Cultural Property
 Meiji Hall at : 1895, registered Tangible Cultural Property
 Dethlefsen House, 1895, former home of A. P. Dethlefsen

Notes

References 

Japanese architects
British expatriates in Japan
1857 births
1940 deaths